The following lists events that happened during 1920 in Chile.

Incumbents
President of Chile: Juan Luis Sanfuentes (until 23 December), Arturo Alessandri

Events

June
25 June – Chilean presidential election, 1920

Births
14 January – Julio Alberto Mercado Illanes (d. 1994)
27 June – Fernando Riera (d. 2010)
19 September – Gustavo Leigh (d. 1999)
15 October – Miguel Busquets (d. 2002)
31 October – Francisco Urroz, footballer (d. 1992)

Deaths 
12 April – Teresa of Los Andes (b. 1900)

References 

 
Years of the 20th century in Chile
Chile